Bateman's principle, in evolutionary biology, is that in most species, variability in reproductive success (or reproductive variance) is greater in males than in females. It was first proposed by Angus John Bateman (1919–1996), an English geneticist. Bateman suggested that, since males are capable of producing millions of sperm cells with little effort, while females invest much higher levels of energy in order to nurture a relatively small number of eggs, the female plays a significantly larger role in their offspring's reproductive success. Bateman's paradigm thus views females as the limiting factor of parental investment, over which males will compete in order to 
copulate successfully.

Although Bateman's principle served as a cornerstone for the study of sexual selection for many decades, it has recently been subject to criticism. Attempts to reproduce Bateman's experiments in 2012 and 2013 were unable to support his conclusions. Some scientists have criticized Bateman's experimental and statistical methods, or pointed out conflicting evidence, while others have defended the veracity of the principle and cited evidence in support of it.

Description 
Typically it is the females who have a relatively larger investment in producing each offspring. Bateman attributed the origin of the unequal investment to the differences in the production of gametes: sperm are cheaper than eggs. A single male can easily fertilize all of a female's eggs; she will not produce more offspring by mating with more than one male.  A male is capable of fathering more offspring if he mates with several females.  By and large, a male's potential reproductive success is limited by the number of females he mates with, whereas a female's potential reproductive success is limited by how many eggs she can produce. According to Bateman's principle, this results in sexual selection, in which males compete with each other, and females become choosy in which males to mate with. Thus, as a result of being anisogamous, males are fundamentally promiscuous, and females are fundamentally selective.

History 
Bateman initially published his review in 1948. He was a botanist, contributing to the literature of sexual selection only once in his lifetime. Bateman initially saw his study on Drosophila to be a test of Charles Darwin's doctrine of sexual selection, which he saw not as flawed, but as incomplete. He felt that if he were to provide a concrete demonstration of how sexual selection played a role in the reproductive success of certain species, he could explain the gap between Darwin's ideas and sexual dimorphism.

Although it is common to confuse Bateman's ideas with those of later scientists, his principle can be expressed in three simple statements. The first is that male reproductive success increases with the number of mates they attempt to copulate with, while female reproductive success does not. The second is that male reproductive success will show greater variance than female. The third is that sexual selection will have a greater effect on the sex with greater variance in reproductive success.

Bateman's study 
Throughout his research, Bateman conducted experiments using fruit flies in order to observe their copulation and sexual behavior. A total of six series of experiments were conducted with the fruit fly Drosophila melanogaster, using three to five individuals of each sex. Each trial ran for three or four days. Some ran to completion without the transfer of the Drosophila from one environment (bottle) to another. In the others, Bateman transferred the flies and their eggs to a new bottle every day. Bateman also varied the age of the flies depending on the experiment, with an age gap between one and six days total. He never watched the flies' copulations. The flies used were from several inbred strains, which meant they could be identified by their specific inbred strain. Therefore, he inferred the number of involved mates based on the number of offspring that were later found to have mutations from both a male and a female. The difficulty that arose was that if a female Drosophila had copulated with five males and only one larva survived, Bateman would not be able to account for the other four copulations.

Analysis of the data collected in sets one through four showed that the males' reproductive success, estimated as the number of sired offspring, increased at a steady rate until a total of three mates were reached. It is important to note that Bateman kept the sex ratio of males to females completely even throughout his trials. But after surpassing three mates, male reproductive success began to fall. Female reproductive success also increased with number of mates, but much more gradually than that of the males. The second series of data collected in sets five and six illustrated a dramatically different outcome. Male reproductive success increased at a steady and steep rate, never dropping. Female reproductive success, on the other hand, plateaued after a single mate. Bateman focused mainly on the second series of data when discussing his results. His main conclusion was that the reproductive success of females does not increase with an influx of mates, as one fit mate was enough to successfully complete fertilization. This is often referred to as Bateman's Gradient.

Replication of Bateman's experiments 

Throughout 2012 and 2013, Gowaty, Kim, and Anderson repeated Bateman's experiment in its entirety, staying as close to Bateman's published methodology as possible. They found that upon combining certain fly strains with one another, the offspring were unable to survive to adulthood. Thus, Bateman's results regarding the number of individuals not having mated was too high. This was valid for both the males and females.

Gowaty desired to further explore the reasoning behind the premature death of the Drosophila. She began doing so by running monogamy trials between different strains of flies and found that 25% of the offspring died due to becoming double mutants. (Gowaty 2013) Bateman thought his work fit within the lines of Mendel's laws of genetics, while Gowaty proved otherwise. The 1948 experiments inferred reproductive success based on the number of adults living by the end of the trial. In reality, many factors were left out of the equation when calculating reproductive success as a function of the number of mates, which had the ability to completely dislodge the accuracy behind Bateman's results. Gowaty was not able to confirm Bateman's conclusions and found no evidence for sexual selection in the experiment. (Gowaty 2013)

Related experiments 
Nevertheless, some modern experiments between the relationship of number of mates and the reproductive success of males and females support Bateman's principle. Julie Collet conducted an experiment with a population of red jungle fowl. A total of thirteen replicate groups of three males and four females were monitored for ten days. In this experiment, the sex ratio was biased toward females. A male's reproductive success was calculated using the proportion of embryos fathered to the total number of embryos produced by all the females he mated with. The total sexual selection opportunity was calculated using the following formula.

The σ2 represents the variance in RS, while the is the square mean of reproductive success of members of one sex in a group.

In 2013, Fritzsche and Arnqvist tested Bateman's principle by estimating sexual selection between males and females in four seed beetles. They used a unique experimental design that showed sexual selection to be greater in males than in females. In contrast, sexual selection was also shown to be stronger for females in role-reversed species. They suggested that the Bateman gradient is typically the most accurate and informative measure of sexual selection between different sexes and species.

Modern criticism 
More than 60 years later, Bateman's principle has received considerable attention. Sutherland argued that males' higher variance in reproductive success may result from random mating and coincidence. Hubbell and Johnson suggested that variance in reproductive success can be greatly influenced by the time and allocations of mating. In 2005, Gowaty and Hubbell suggested that mating tendencies are subject to change depending on certain strategies. They argued that there are cases in which males can be more selective than females, whereas Bateman suggested that his paradigm would be “almost universal” among sexually reproducing species. Critics proposed that females might be more subject to sexual selection than males, but not in all circumstances.

Experimental and statistical criticisms followed. Until approximately a decade ago, critics of Bateman's model focused on his experimental design. In recent years, they have shifted attention to the actual experimental and statistical calculations Bateman published throughout his trials. Birkhead wrote a 2000 review arguing that since Bateman's experiments lasted only three to four days, the female fruit fly, Drosophila melanogaster, may not have needed to mate repeatedly, as it can store sperm for up to four days; if Bateman had used a species in which females had to copulate more often to fertilize their eggs, the results might have been different. Snyder and Gowaty conducted the first in-depth analysis of the data in Bateman's 1948 paper. They found sampling biases, mathematical errors, and selective presentation of data.

A 2012 review by Zuleyma Tang-Martínez concluded that various empirical and theoretical studies, especially Gowaty's reproduction of Bateman's original experiment, pose a major challenge to Bateman's conclusions, and that Bateman's principle should be considered an unproven hypothesis in need of further reexamination. According to Tang-Martínez, "modern data simply don't support most of Bateman's and Trivers's predictions and assumptions."

A 2016 review confirmed Darwinian sex roles across the animal kingdom, concluding that "sexual selection, as captured by standard Bateman metrics, is indeed stronger in males than in females and that it is evolutionarily tied to sex biases in parental care and sexual dimorphism."

One error source that have been shown to give an illusion of greater differential in reproductive success in males than in females genetically is that chromosome effects cause a greater percentage of mutations to be lethal before even reaching sexual maturity in males than in females.

The assumption that any differential in reproductive success between males and females among the individuals that do reach sexual maturity must be due to sexual selection in the current population is also subject to criticism, such as the possibility of remnants of sexually selected traits in a previous species from which a new species have evolved can be negatively selected due to costs in nutrients and weakened immune systems and that such negative selection would cause a higher difference in reproductive success in males than in females even without any still ongoing sexual selection. Since lower degrees of selection during times of stable environment allows genetic variation to build up by random mutations and allow some individuals in a population to survive environmental change while strong constant selection offsets the effect and increases the risk of the entire population dying out during catastrophic environmental change due to less genetic variation, constant loss of genetic variation caused by sexual selection have been suggested as a factor contributing to higher extinction rates in more sexually dimorphic species besides the nutrient, immunity and other costs of the ornaments themselves. While the ornament cost risk would only be removed when the ornaments have been eliminated by selection, the genetic variation model predicts that the species ability to survive would improve significantly even at an early stage of reduction of sexual dimorphism due to other adaptive mutations arising and surviving due to minimal selection during times of stable environment while the genes causing sexually dimorphic anatomy have only in small part been affected by the mutations. Applied to human evolution, this model can explain why early Homo sapiens display a significantly increased adaptability to environmental change already at its early divergence from Homo erectus that had a high muscular sexual dimorphism, as well as why human anatomy through the history of Homo sapiens show a diversification during times of stable climate and a selective loss of the more robust male forms during environmental change that does not recover during later stability, continuing through the loss of many robust characteristics in regional bottlenecks as recent as the end of the Ice Age and the time around the agricultural revolution. It also explains genetic evidence of human genetic diversity increasing during stable environmental periods and being reduced during bottlenecks related to changes in the environment.

Conflicting evidence 
Recently, DNA testing has permitted more detailed investigation of mating behavior in numerous species. The results, in many cases, have been cited as evidence against Bateman's principle.

Until recently, most bird species were believed to be sexually monogamous. DNA paternity testing, however, has shown that in nearly 90% of bird species, females copulate with multiple males during each breeding season. The superb fairy wren is socially monogamous, but 95% of its clutches contain young fathered by extra-pair males. Up to 87% of tree swallow clutches, 75% of coal tit clutches, and 70% of reed bunting clutches contain young fathered by extra-pair males. Even female waved albatrosses, which typically mate for life, are sexually promiscuous, with 17% of young fathered by extra-pair males.

In many primate species, females solicit sex from males and may mate with more than one male in quick succession. Female lions may mate 100 times per day with different males while they are in estrus. Females of the pseudoscorpion species, Cordylochernes scorpioides, have been shown to have higher reproductive success when mated with more than one male.

Sex-role reversed species 
The most well-known exceptions to Bateman's principle are the existence of sex-role reversed species such as pipefish (seahorses), phalaropes and jacanas in which the males perform the majority of the parental care, and are cryptic while the females are highly ornamented and territorially aggressive. 

In these species, however, the typical fundamental sex differences are reversed: females have a faster reproductive rate than males (and thus greater reproductive variance), and males have greater assurance of genetic parentage than do females. Consequently, reversals in sex roles and reproductive variance are consistent with Bateman's principle, and with Robert Trivers's parental investment theory.

See also 
 Variability hypothesis
 Cinderella effect
 Coolidge effect
 Hypergamy
 Parental investment
 Paternal care

References

Sources

Further reading 

 
 
 .

External links 
 Popular articles on sex-role reversal

Ecological theories
Evolutionary biology
Principles
1948 introductions